Kimberley Girls' High School is a high school located on Elsmere Road in Kimberley, Northern Cape, South Africa. It is over a hundred years old and has close affiliation with Kimberley Boys' High School and Kimberley Junior School.

History
Kimberley Girls' High School was founded on 12 April 1887 in Woodley Street Hall. The Girls' High and Boys' High Schools, jointly known as the Kimberley Undenominational Schools, occupied separate wings of the building in Lanyon Terrace until 1913 when they moved to their present sites.

References

External links
Kimberley Girls' High School website

See also
Kimberley Boys' High School

Schools in the Northern Cape
Girls' schools in South Africa
Educational institutions established in 1887
Kimberley, Northern Cape
Buildings and structures in Kimberley, Northern Cape
1887 establishments in the Cape Colony
1887 in South Africa
South African heritage sites
High schools in South Africa